Southeast Limburgish (Dutch: Zuidoost-Limburgs, Ripuarian: Süüdoß-Limburjesch), also referred to as Southern Meuse-Rhenish, is a subdivision of what recently has been named Meuse-Rhenish. Both terms denote a rather compact grouping of varieties spoken in the Limburg and Lower Rhineland regions, near the common Dutch/Flemish (Belgium) and Dutch/German borders. These dialectal varieties differ notably from Dutch and Flemish at the one side, and no less from German at the other.

In the Netherlands and Belgium this group is often included in the generic term Limburgish. Limburgish was recognised as a regional language in the Netherlands and as such it receives moderate protection under chapter 2 of the European Charter for Regional or Minority Languages.
The linguistic border of the Limburgish varieties to the South is the Benrath line, to the North it is the Uerdingen line. This means Southeast Limburgish is different in nature from the other Limburgish varieties.

Southeast Limburgish is not to be confused with Southern East Limburgish dialects (such as the Sittard dialect), which are varieties of East Limburgish.

Southeast Limburgish around Aachen

Southeast Limburgish is spoken around Kerkrade, Bocholtz and Vaals in the Netherlands, Aachen in Germany and Raeren and Eynatten in Belgium. In Germany it is sometimes considered as Ripuarian, not always as Limburgish. This explains why it is not distinctly marked on both maps (at right and below). These pictures, however, have to be fine-tuned for the transitional zone between Limburgish and Ripuarian. In Belgium, the southeastern boundary between Meuse-Rhenish (Du: Maas-Rijnlands, Fr: francique rhéno-mosan) and Ripuarian is formed by the so-called Low Dietsch (Limburgish: Platduutsj, Du: Platdiets, Fr: platdutch, francique carolingien) language area. According to a vision, all varieties in a wider half circle some 20 km around Aachen, including 2/3 of Dutch South Limburg and the Low Dietsch area between Voeren and Eupen in Belgium, can be taken as a group of its own, at the place where the Netherlands, Belgium and Germany meet. This variety still possesses interesting syntactic idiosyncrasies, probably dating from the period in which the old Duchy of Limburg existed.

Relation to Ripuarian
If only tonality is to be taken as to define this variety, both Southeast Limburgish and Ripuarian belong to a broader class of Meuse-Rhenish varieties in a wider sense. This tonal language group stretches rather deep into Germany, even across the Rhine up to Siegen. In Germany, it is consensus to class both varieties as belonging to High German varieties. But this is a little over-simplified. In order to include this variety properly a more encompassing concept is needed. The combination of Meuse-Rhenish and Ripuarian, including their overlapping transitional zones of Southeast Limburgish and Low Dietsch, will do.

Phonology

As most other dialect of Ripuarian and Limburgish, Southeast Limburgish features a distinction between the thrusting tone (or ), which has a shortening effect on the syllable (not shown in transcriptions in this article) and the slurring tone. In this article, the slurring tone is transcribed as a high tone, whereas the thrusting tone is left unmarked. This is nothing more than a convention, as the phonetics of the Southeast Limburgish pitch accent are severely under-researched. There are minimal pairs, for example   'wall' -   'carrot' in the Kerkrade dialect.

The sounds corresponding to Limburgish  are very back after back vowels, being uvular  (as in Luxembourgish), rather than velar as in Limburgish.

The dialect of Lemiers is much more similar to the dialect of Vaals than the dialect spoken in Vijlen (called  or ) as the former features the High German consonant shift. A Limburgish dialectologist Will Kohnen recommends the spelling  to cover this variation (cf. Vieleter ). In Kerkrade, the shift has been completed and so only the form  occurs.

The palatal  is an allophone of  after consonants, the front vowels and the close-mid central , which phonologically is a front vowel. The two sounds are not distinguished in Rheinische Dokumenta.

In the Netherlands, the consonantal pronunciation is more likely to occur.

The difference lies in transcription, not in realization.
  occurs only in unstressed syllables.
  is a phonological back vowel like , and the two function as a long–short pair. The former is phonetically central , whereas the latter is a genuine back vowel .

See also
Meuse-Rhenish
Limburgish
Low Dietsch

References

 
Cornelissen, Georg (2003): Kleine niederrheinische Sprachgeschichte (1300-1900) : eine regionale Sprachgeschichte für das deutsch-niederländische Grenzgebiet zwischen Arnheim und Krefeld [with an introduction in Dutch]. Geldern / Venray: Stichting Historie Peel-Maas-Niersgebied,

Further reading

 Ludewig Rovenhagen: Wörterbuch der Aachener Mundart, Aachen, 1912.
 Prof. Dr. Will Herrmanns, Rudolf Lantin (editor): Aachener Sprachschatz. Wörterbuch der Aachener Mundart. Beiträge zur Kultur- und Wirtschaftsgeschichte Aachens und Seiner Umgebung, Band 1. Im Auftrag des Vereins „Öcher Platt“ für den Druck überarbeitet und herausgegeben von Dr. Rudolf Lantin. 2 Bände. Verlag J. A. Mayer, 1970. 
 Adolf Steins: Grammatik des Aachener Dialekts. Herausgegeben von Klaus-Peter Lange. Rheinisches Archiv Band 141. Böhlau-Verlag, Kölle, Weimar, Wien, 1998. 
 Dr. Karl Allgeier, Jutta Baumschulte, Meinolf Baumschulte, Richard Wolfgarten: Aachener Dialekt - Wortschatz, Öcher Platt - Hochdeutsch und Hochdeutsch - Öcher Platt. Öcher Platt e.V. Aachen, 2000.

Bibliography

West Germanic languages
Limburgish language
Low Franconian languages
Central German languages
Ripuarian language